Wolfgang "Paule" Seguin (born 14 September 1945) is an East German former professional footballer.

Club career
Seguin took up playing football in his hometown of Burg in 1953. He spent ten years with Einheit Burg, playing an attacking role. In 1963 he transferred to SC Aufbau Magdeburg, where he would play 380 Oberliga matches until ending his career in 1981. He also played 23 matches in the second-tier DDR-Liga. Seguin does not only hold 1. FC Magdeburg's record for most league appearances at 403, but with 57 European matches and 69 FDGB-Pokal appearances, he is the club's record player there as well. Altogether, Seguin played 529 competitive matches at 1. FC Magdeburg.
Seguin holds another record, appearing in 219 Oberliga matches in a row between 1971 and 1979.

In the 1974 UEFA Cup Winners' Cup Final Seguin decided the match, scoring the game's second goal against holders A.C. Milan and leading 1. FC Magdeburg to the title. Three Oberliga championships and six FDGB-Pokal victories complete his titles with the club side.

International career
From 1972 to 1975, Seguin won 19 caps with East Germany and took part in the 1974 FIFA World Cup in West Germany. He also played 4 matches at the 1972 Summer Olympics, winning a shared bronze medal.

Honours

Club
1. FC Magdeburg
UEFA Cup Winners' Cup: 1974
DDR-Oberliga: 1972, 1974, 1975
'FDGB-Pokal: 1964, 1965, 1969, 1973, 1978, 1979

International
East Germany
Olympic Football Tournament bronze medal: 1972

References

External links

 
 

1945 births
Living people
German footballers
East German footballers
1974 FIFA World Cup players
Footballers at the 1972 Summer Olympics
Olympic footballers of East Germany
Olympic bronze medalists for East Germany
East Germany international footballers
1. FC Magdeburg players
Olympic medalists in football
DDR-Oberliga players
Medalists at the 1972 Summer Olympics
Association football midfielders
People from Burg bei Magdeburg
Footballers from Saxony-Anhalt
People from Bezirk Magdeburg